Bartholomew Mastrius (Bartholomaeus, Bartolomeo Mastri) (Meldola, near Forlì, 7 December 1602 – Meldola, 11 January 1673) was an Italian Conventual Franciscan philosopher and theologian.

Life

Born at Meldola, near Forlì, in 1602, he was a Conventual Franciscan. He received his early education at Cesena and took degrees in Rome. He also frequented the 'studia' of his religious order in Bologna and Naples before assuming the duties of lecturer in Cesena, Perugia and Padua. He died in Meldola in 1673.

He acquired a profound knowledge of scholastic philosophy and theology, being deeply versed in the writings of Duns Scotus. Nevertheless, he was an open-minded and independent scholar. As a controversialist he was harsh and arrogant towards his opponents, mingling invective with his arguments. His opinions on some philosophical questions were fiercely combatted by many of his contemporaries and especially by Matthew Ferchi and the Irish Franciscan John Punch. When presenting the second volume of his work on the "Sentences" to Alexander VII, to whom he had dedicated it, the pope asked him where he had learned to treat his opponent Ferchi in such a rough manner: Mastrius answered,

"From St. Augustine and St. Jerome, who in defence of their respective opinions on the interpretation of Holy Scripture fought hard and not without reason":

the pope smilingly remarked, "From such masters other things could be learned".

In 2002, to celebrate the fourth centenary of his birth, an international conference was held in Meldola, Mastri’s native town (near Forlì), devoted to his philosophical thought.

Works

He was one of the most prominent writers of his time on philosophy and theology. His "Philosophy" in five volumes folio, his "Commentaries" on the "Sentences" in four volumes, and his Moral Theology "ad mentem S. Bonaventurae" in one volume were all published in Venice.

Ponce in his treatise on Logic holds that with qualifying explanations God may be included in the Categories. Mastrius in combatting this opinion characteristically says, "Hic Pontius male tractat Deum sicut et alter".

Mastrius had a well-ordered intellect which is seen in the clearness and precision with which he sets forth the subject-matter of discussion. His arguments for and against a proposition show real critical power and are expressed in accurate and clear language. His numerous quotations from ancient and contemporary authors and various schools of thought are a proof of his extensive reading. His works shed light on some of the difficult questions in Scotistic philosophy and theology.

References
 
 Claus A. Andersen, Metaphysik im Barockscotismus. Untersuchungen zum Metaphysikwerk des Bartholomaeus Mastrius. Mit Dokumentation der Metaphysik in der scotistischen Tradition ca. 1620-1750, Benjamins (Bochumer Studien zur Philosophie 57), Amsterdam / Philadelphia 2016.
 Marco Forlivesi, Scotistarum princeps. Bartolomeo Mastri (1602–1673) e il suo tempo, Padova 2002.
 Marco Forlivesi (ed.), "Rem in seipsa cernere". Saggi sul pensiero filosofico di Bartolomeo Mastri (1602–1673), Padova 2006.
 Daniel Heider, Universals in Second Scholasticism. A comparative study with focus on the theories of Francisco Suárez S.J. (1548-1617), João Poinsot O.P. (1589-1644) and Bartolomeo Mastri da Meldola O.F.M. Conv. (1602-1673)/Bonaventura Belluto O.F.M. Conv. (1600-1676), Philadelphia, John Benjamins, 2014.

External links
 
  Scholasticon page
  Jacob Schmutz, Mastri, Bartolomeo BBKL

Attribution

1602 births
1673 deaths
People from Meldola
Conventual Friars Minor
17th-century Italian Roman Catholic theologians
Scotism